Food Inspectors is a BBC television series that investigates the health and hygiene surrounding 'food'. The show, which is a spin-off from Watchdog began airing in February 2012, is presented by Chris Hollins and Matt Allwright of Watchdog and in 2014, Gaby Roslin joined the presenting team.

Series overview

Episodes

Series 1
The first series consisted of four episodes, beginning on 29 February and ending on 28 March 2012 on BBC One.

Series 2
The second series ran from 9–30 January 2013 and lasted for four episodes on BBC One.

Series 3
The third series began airing on 15 May 2014 on BBC One. Once again the series consists of four episodes each of an hour in length.

References

External links

2012 British television series debuts
2014 British television series endings
BBC Television shows
British non-fiction television series
British television spin-offs
Business-related television series in the United Kingdom
Consumer protection in the United Kingdom
Consumer protection television series
Documentary television series about industry
English-language television shows
Food safety in the United Kingdom
Hospitality industry in the United Kingdom
Television series by All3Media